Hyalurga partita is a moth of the family Erebidae. It was described by Francis Walker in 1854. It is found in Brazil, Suriname, French Guiana and Venezuela.

References

 

Hyalurga
Moths described in 1854